Norra skenet (Northern Light) is a sculpture by the artist Ernst Nordin at the Umeå University campus in Umeå in Sweden.

History
As part of the planning of the Umeå University campus, a competition for a sculpture was held 1967 and won by Ernst Nordin. Norra skenet was raised 1969 at the campus and moved to the actual location close to the University Dam in 1995, due to the construction of the Teachers' Training Hall.

The sculpture is made of polished stainless steel. Rectangular steel pipes have been welded together in a diagonal composition, resembling Aurora Borealis (Northern Lights). The structure is lit by built-in spotlights. 

Umeå University makes use of the sculpture as a symbol in its marketing.

References
 Skulpturguide Umeå, published by Västerbottens konstförening, Umeå 2005, page 162, 
 Konstvandring på Umeå universitet. En guide till konsten på campus, published by Umeå University, p. 22,  

Tourist attractions in Umeå
Outdoor sculptures in Sweden
Umeå University
Public art in Umeå
Stainless steel sculptures